Baliton (also, Boliton, Bəliton, Baleton, and Beleton) is a village and municipality in the Lankaran Rayon of Azerbaijan. It has a population of 1,096. The municipality consists of the villages of Baliton, Horavenc, and Şivlik.

References 

Populated places in Lankaran District